The 17th Australian Film Awards ceremony, presented by the Australian Film Institute (AFI) honoured the best Australian films of 1974 and 1975 and took place on 23 March 1975, at the Sydney Opera House, in Sydney, New South Wales. Actress Glenda Jackson hosted the ceremony.

Winners
In the competition the Australian Film Institute (AFI) presented awards across nine categories. The winners of the Golden Reel prize included feature film Sunday Too Far Away (which is considered the winner of the Best Film category), tele-movie Billy and Percy, and documentary Mr. Symbol Man; feature films Petersen and The True Story of Eskimo Nell and documentaries A Steam Train Passes and Stirring won the Silver prize; and the film Between Wars won the Bronze prize. Awards were also handed out in feature film categories for Best Actor, which went to Jack Thompson for Sunday Too Far Away and Petersen and Martin Vaughan for Billy and Percy; Julie Dawson for Best Actress, for Who Killed Jenny Langby?; Barry Humphries and Reg Lye for Best Supporting Actor, for The Great Macarthy and Sunday Too Far Away respectively; and John Power for Best Direction, for Billy and Percy.

References

Further reading

Film
1974 film awards
1975 film awards
1975 in Australian cinema